During the 2001–2002 English football season, Queens Park Rangers F.C. competed in the Football League Second Division.

Final league table

Results

Legend

Football League Second Division

FA Cup

League Cup

LDV Vans Trophy

Players

First-team squad
Squad at end of season

Left club during season

References

Notes

Queens Park Rangers F.C. seasons
Queens Park Rangers F.C.